Warwickshire Catholic Independent Schools Foundation (WCISF) is an educational organisation based in Warwickshire, England. It was founded in 2002 due to the merger of Princethorpe College near Rugby with St Joseph's School in Kenilworth. St Joseph's has since been rebranded Crackley Hall School after the building in which it is located.

WCISF schools and nurseries
There are four educational establishments within the WCISF:

 Princethorpe College Sixth Form - Sixth Form for young adults aged 16 to 18 years
 Princethorpe College - Secondary school for children aged 11 to 16 years
 Crackley Hall School - Junior school for children aged 4 to 11 years
 Little Crackers Nursery - Nursery for children aged 2 to 4 years.

References 

Educational organisations based in England
2002 establishments in England